Turlough O'Brien is a Gaelic football manager. He managed Carlow between 2014 and 2020.

In the 2018 National Football League, O'Brien led the team out of Division 4. This was their first promotion in more than three decades.

In the 2018 Leinster Senior Football Championship, he led Carlow to a quarter-final victory against Kildare at O'Connor Park.

He resigned in June 2020.

References

Living people
Gaelic football managers
Year of birth missing (living people)